The Dayton Philharmonic Orchestra (DPO) is a fully professional musical group in Dayton, Ohio, formed in 1933. It is a member of the League of American Orchestras (LAO) and the Regional Orchestra Players' Association (ROPA), and presents programs mainly of classical music, but also occasionally performs world music, pops, jazz and rock-n-roll.

Between September and May each year, the orchestra performs about 9 full-orchestra concert series, 4 chamber orchestra series, 4 operas with the Dayton Opera, 3 light family concerts, 4 Young People's Concerts, 6 SuperPops series, and several concerts for special occasions.

History
The DPO has been housed in the Schuster Performing Arts Center since 2003.  Prior to that, the orchestra played concerts at Dayton Memorial Hall, the Dayton Convention Center, and the Victoria Theatre.  The orchestra has been led by Musical Director Neal Gittleman since 1995.

Conductors
1933-1975 - Paul Katz
1975-1987 - Charles Wendelken-Wilson
1987-1994 - Isaiah Jackson
1994–present - Neal Gittleman

Dayton Philharmonic Youth Orchestra
Founded in 1937 by Paul Katz, the DPYO is the 3rd oldest youth orchestra in the United States.

The DPYO performs three concerts each season and was invited to perform at the 2002, 2004, 2006, 2014, and 2018 Ohio Music Education Association conferences. The Youth Orchestra regularly appears on the Dayton Philharmonic's Family Concert Series, which has included collaborations with Cirque de la Symphonie, Zoot Theatre, the Dayton Ballet II Senior Company, performance artist Dan Kamin, and the Magic Circle Mime Company. The Dayton Philharmonic Youth Orchestra celebrated its 80th anniversary in the 2017–2018 season by commissioning composer Austin Jaquith to compose a work for the orchestra. The DPYO celebrates its 85th season in 2022-2023.

The DPYO is supported by the Dayton Performing Arts Alliance, Dayton Philharmonic Orchestra, the Association of Parents and Friends of the Dayton Philharmonic Youth Orchestra, and by the Dayton Philharmonic Volunteer Association. The DPYO is affiliated with the Youth Division of the League of American Orchestras. The youth orchestra rehearses weekly during the school year at the University of Dayton's Raymond L. Fitz Hall.

Conductors
1937-1941 - Paul Katz
1941-1968 - Marjorie Kline
1968-1976 - Jaroslav Holesovsky
1976-1978 - Ken Miller
1978-1995 - William J. Steinohrt
1995-1999 - Peter Ciaschini
2000–present - Patrick Reynolds

Dayton Philharmonic Youth Strings
The youth string orchestra is open for competitive audition for students of string instruments in grades 6 - 12. It was originally known as the Dayton Philharmonic Junior String Orchestra. The name was changed in 2011 to the Dayton Philharmonic Youth Strings.

Conductors
1982-1991 - William R. Scutt
1991-1998 - Xiao-Guang Zhu
1998-2009 - Karen Young
2009–present - Betsey Hofeldt

Dayton Philharmonic Junior Strings
The Dayton Philharmonic Junior Strings was formed in 2014 for young string players not quite ready for the Dayton Philharmonic Youth Strings. The junior string orchestra is open for competitive audition for students of string instruments in grades 4–8.

Conductors

2014–present - Kara Camfield

References

External links
 Official site
 Dayton Philharmonic Youth Orchestra

Musical groups from Dayton, Ohio
Tourist attractions in Dayton, Ohio
Musical groups established in 1933
Orchestras based in Ohio